Jafar-e Sadeq (also Romanized as Ja‘far-e Şādeq and Ja‘far Şādeq; also known as Ja’far Sadegh) is a village in Howmeh-ye Sharqi Rural District, in the Central District of Ramhormoz County, Khuzestan Province, Iran. At the 2006 census, its population was 444, in 97 families.

References 

Populated places in Ramhormoz County